The First Baptist Church and Society is a historic Baptist church in Swansea, Massachusetts. The congregation, founded in 1663, is the oldest Baptist congregation in Massachusetts and one of the oldest in the United States.

The congregation was founded in 1663 by John Myles as the first Baptist congregation in Massachusetts, and Myles brought the Ilston Book with him from Swansea in Wales. The congregation in Swansea, Massachusetts was located relatively nearby the First Baptist Church in America in Providence.

The current Greek Revival meeting house was constructed in 1848 and is the fifth building occupied by the congregation. The adjacent cemetery dates to 1731. The building and cemetery were added to the National Register of Historic Places in 1990.

See also
National Register of Historic Places listings in Bristol County, Massachusetts
Baptists in the United States

References

External links

Rev. John Myles and the founding of the first Baptist church in Massachusetts

1663 establishments in Massachusetts
Baptist churches in Massachusetts
Churches completed in 1848
Churches on the National Register of Historic Places in Massachusetts
Churches in Bristol County, Massachusetts
National Register of Historic Places in Bristol County, Massachusetts
Swansea, Massachusetts